

Incumbents
President: Roch Marc Christian Kaboré
Prime Minister: Christophe Joseph Marie Dabiré

Events
February 16 - Pansi church shooting
October 4 -  A night attack on a convoy of 46 people, who were returning to their homes from the town of Pissila, hoping for improved security, leading to the death of 25 people, all men. 
November 22 - 2020 Burkinabé general election President Roch Marc Christian Kabore reelected.
December 28 – President Roch Marc Christian Kabore is sworn in for a second term.

Predicted and Scheduled Events
2020 Burkinabé constitutional referendum

Deaths

March 18 - Rose Marie Compaoré, politician

See also
Boko Haram

References

 
2020s in Burkina Faso
Years of the 21st century in Burkina Faso
Burkina Faso